Annabell Oeschger (born 1 November 1993) is a German professional racing cyclist. She rides for the Feminine Cycling Team.

See also
 List of 2015 UCI Women's Teams and riders

References

External links
 

1993 births
Living people
German female cyclists
People from Lahr
Sportspeople from Freiburg (region)
Cyclists from Baden-Württemberg